Shestayevo is a rural locality (a selo) and the administrative centre of Shestayevsky Selsoviet, Davlekanovsky District, Bashkortostan, Russia. The population was 154 as of 2010. There are 3 streets.

Geography 
Shestayevo is located 28 km north of Davlekanovo (the district's administrative centre) by road. Politotdel is the nearest rural locality.

References 

Rural localities in Davlekanovsky District